The Tavis Smiley Show was an American public broadcasting radio talk show.

Public Radio International
The Tavis Smiley Show was broadcast on Public Radio International (PRI). It was a one-hour weekly program featuring interviews with news makers, thought leaders and artists and seeks to bring diverse perspectives to the airwaves. It was produced by Smiley Radio Properties, Inc., in partnership with PRI at Smiley's studio in Los Angeles, California. The program ran two hours per week until October 2010 when the second hour became the sister program Smiley & West, co-hosted by longtime Smiley collaborator Dr. Cornel West. The show ended in 2017.

History of radio show 
The first version of The Tavis Smiley Show was on National Public Radio (NPR). It was broadcast daily from January 2002 to December 16, 2004, in Los Angeles, when the host Tavis Smiley decided not to renew his contract with NPR.  Some of the reasons cited based on an article by Howard Kurtz for not renewing the contract were 1) Tavis Smiley wanted to tape his show a day in advance, and NPR did not agree; 2) against federal funding policies, Tavis Smiley wished to own the right to rebroadcast the show; and 3) Tavis Smiley appealed to have the budget for promoting the program significantly increased, and NPR did not have the budget to do so.

The show was a news and opinion program focusing upon issues of race, diversity, and ethnicity and often featured guest speakers. It was an hour-long show.

The show was helped through a collaboration with various public radio stations. It was replaced on some radio stations by News & Notes which follows much the same format and topics. Many other radio stations replaced it with the short-lived NPR News with Tony Cox.

Notes

External links
 Official website of the PRI show
 Official website of the PBS show
 Official website of the NPR show

American talk radio programs
Public Radio International programs
2004 radio programme debuts
2017 radio programme endings